Vanicela is a genus of moths in the family Stathmopodidae, although it is sometimes included in the Roeslerstammiidae family.

Species
Vanicela dentigera Meyrick, 1913 (from Australia)
Vanicela disjunctella Walker, 1864 (from New Zealand)
Vanicela haliphanes  Meyrick, 1927 (from Samoa)
Vanicela tricolona Meyrick, 1913 (from Australia)
Vanicela xenadelpha Meyrick, 1889 (from Australia)

References

www.boldsystems.org
Markku Savela's ftp.funet.fi

Stathmopodidae
Moth genera